There have been two baronetcies created for persons with the surname Holcroft, both in the Baronetage of the United Kingdom for members of the same family.

The Holcroft Baronetcy, of The Shrubbery in the Parish of Kingswinford in the County of Stafford, was created in the Baronetage of the United Kingdom on 28 July 1905 for the iron and coal master Charles Holcroft. He was also a collector of fossils and a benefactor to the University of Birmingham. The title became extinct on his death in 1917.

The Holcroft Baronetcy, of Eaton Mascott in the Parish of Berrington in the County of Shropshire, was created in the Baronetage of the United Kingdom on 12 January 1921 for George Holcroft. He was Chairman of Littleton Collieries and also served as high sheriff of Staffordshire from 1913 to 1914. Holcroft was the nephew of the first Baronet of the 1905 creation and like his uncle was a benefactor to the University of Birmingham. The third Baronet was High Sheriff of Shropshire from 1969 to 1970. He died after a short illness in 2009 and was succeeded by his son, the fourth baronet.

Holcroft baronets, of The Shrubbery (1905)
Sir Charles Holcroft, 1st Baronet (1831–1917)

Holcroft baronets, of Eaton Mascott (1921)
Sir George Harry Holcroft, 1st Baronet (1856–1951)
Sir Reginald Culcheth Holcroft, 2nd Baronet (1899–1978)
Sir Peter George Culcheth Holcroft, 3rd Baronet (1931–2009)
Sir Charles Anthony Culcheth Holcroft, 4th Baronet (born 1959)

The heir to the baronetcy is the present holder's son, Toby David Culcheth Holcroft (born 1990).

References

External links
Biography of Sir Charles Holcroft, 1st Baronet

Baronetcies in the Baronetage of the United Kingdom
Extinct baronetcies in the Baronetage of the United Kingdom